Stoycho is a given name. Notable people with the name include:

Stoycho Mladenov (born 1957), Bulgarian footballer
Stoycho Mladenov, Jr. (born 1985), Bulgarian footballer
Stoycho Nedkov (born 1986), Bulgarian footballer
Stoycho Stoev (born 1962), Bulgarian footballer and manager
Stoycho Stoilov (born 1971), Bulgarian footballer
Stoycho Vassilev Breskovski (1934–2004), Bulgarian paleontologist

Bulgarian masculine given names